Tenoranema is a genus of nematodes belonging to the family Capillariidae.

Species:

Tenoranema alcoveri 
Tenoranema magnifica 
Tenoranema rivarolai 
Tenoranema speciosa 
Tenoranema wioletti

References

Nematodes